Eucalyptus yalatensis, commonly known as the Yalata mallee, is a species of mallee or a shrub that is endemic to southern Australia. It has rough, fibrous or flaky bark on the stems, smooth bark above, lance-shaped adult leaves, flower buds mostly in groups of nine, creamy white or yellowish flowers and hemispherical to shortened spherical fruit.

Description
It has rough, fibrous to flaky brownish grey bark on part or all of the stems, smooth pale grey to brownish bark above. It blooms between October and February producing creamy white or pale yellowish flowers.

Taxonomy and naming
Eucalyptus yalatensis was first formally described in 1975 by Clifford Boomsma in the South Australian Naturalist from specimens collected by Bruce Jabez Copley (1933–1984) near Yalata in 1969. The specific epithet and common name refer to the area where the type specimens were collected.

Distribution
Yalata mallee grows in mallee on level to slightly undulating country, sometimes on limestone cliffs but always on calcareous or sandy soil over limestone. It is found from Balladonia and Israelite Bay in the west to the Eyre Peninsula in South Australia, and disjunctly near Mannum.

Conservation status
This eucalypt is classified as "not threatened" by the Western Australian Government Department of Parks and Wildlife.

See also
List of Eucalyptus species

References

Eucalypts of Western Australia
yalatensis
Myrtales of Australia
Flora of South Australia
Plants described in 1975
Mallees (habit)